Kirill Gromov is a Russian professional ice hockey defenceman who currently plays for PSK Sakhalin of the Asia League Ice Hockey (ALIH).

Gromov played eleven games for Amur Khabarovsk of the Kontinental Hockey League during the 2008–09 KHL season where he scored no points. He also played in the Kazakhstan Hockey Championship for Gornyak Rudny and Arlan Kokshetau and in the Professional Hockey League in Ukraine for HC Levy before joining Sakhalin in 2014.

References

External links

1990 births
Living people
Arlan Kokshetau players
Gornyak Rudny players
Amur Khabarovsk players
Russian ice hockey defencemen
PSK Sakhalin players
Yermak Angarsk players
People from Blagoveshchensk
Sportspeople from Amur Oblast